Ambrosia cordifolia, called the Tucson bur ragweed, is a North American species of plant in the family Asteraceae. It is native to northern Mexico (Sonora, Sinaloa, San Luis Potosí, Guanajuato, Baja California Sur) and the State of Arizona in the United States.

Ambrosia cordifolia is a shrub up to 50 cm (20 inches) tall. Leaves are triangular or heart-shaped. Flower heads are small and inconspicuous, as the plant is wind-pollinated. The heads develop into spiny burs as the seeds ripen.

The reference to the Arizona city of Tucson in the common name refers to the species' first discovery by Cyrus G. Pringle in the mountains near Tucson in 1884.

References

External links
Pollen Library, Tucson Burr-Ragweed (Ambrosia cordifolia)
Cabeza Prieta Natural History Association, Sonoran Desert Plants, Ambrosia cordifolia (Heart-leaf Bur-sage)

cordifolia
Flora of Arizona
Flora of Baja California Sur
Flora of Guanajuato
Flora of San Luis Potosí
Flora of Sinaloa
Flora of Sonora
Plants described in 1884
Taxa named by Asa Gray